Francesco Adami or Francesco de Adamo de Lucharo (1457–1497) was a Roman Catholic prelate who served as Bishop of Isernia (1486–1497).

Biography
Francesco Adami was born in 1457.
On 10 Apr 1486, he was appointed during the papacy of Pope Innocent VIII as Bishop of Isernia.
He served as Bishop of Isernia until his death in 1497.

References

External links and additional sources
 (for Chronology of Bishops) 
 (for Chronology of Bishops)  

15th-century Italian Roman Catholic bishops
Bishops appointed by Pope Innocent VIII
1457 births
1497 deaths